Chemainus Secondary is a public high school in Chemainus, British Columbia part of School District 79 Cowichan Valley. It was founded in 1953 and it serves students from the area around Chemainus, Crofton, Thetis Island and southern Saltair, British Columbia.

There are approximately 400 students at the school, the majority of whom are Caucasian, but with many nearby Aboriginal Reserves there is a sizeable First Nations minority. Also, about 30-35 students from Asia, mainly Japan, South Korea, and Hong Kong are enrolled.

From 2003 until 2005 the school went through a major renovation, updating many facilities in the school. The library has been fortunate to receive two Times Colonist Raise a Reader Grants. The first in 2008–9, for $1,400, was directed to Science reading materials. In 2009–10, the school received $1,200 for audio books and the companion novels.

External links
 Chemainus Secondary School
School Reports - Ministry of Education
 Class Size
 Satisfaction Survey
 School Performance
 Skills Assessment

High schools in British Columbia
Educational institutions established in 1953
1953 establishments in British Columbia